The 406th Air Expeditionary Wing (406 AEW) is a provisional unit assigned to the United States Air Forces in Europe.

The wing was reactivated in early 2003 as a provisional wing to be used as part of Operation Iraqi Freedom (OIF), based in Turkey.  When Turkey refused to allow its territory to be used as part of the March 2003 invasion of Iraq, It seems likely the 406 AEW was inactivated shortly afterward.

Sometime afterward, it was possibly reactivated at RAFO Thumrait, Oman, possibly with KC-135 tankers. Possibly later moved to Camp Bastion, Afghanistan. Its current status is undetermined.

History

406th Fighter-Bomber Wing

On 10 July 1952, the 123d Fighter-Bomber Wing at RAF Manston, England was released from federal service and returned to the Kentucky Air National Guard, while its personnel and equipment were transferred to the newly activated 406th Fighter-Bomber Wing. The fighter squadrons being replaced by the 512th, 513th and 514th respectively, the F-84G Thunderjets and support aircraft of the ANG were assigned to the 406th Fighter-Bomber Group. The 406th FBW commanded the functions of both the support groups as well as the flying combat 406th FBG. The few National Guardsmen still with the wing departed and the last were released from active duty on 9 July, although a few reserve officers remained on active duty for an additional six to twelve months.

On 1 May 1956, when 406th FIW converted to Tri-Deputate organization, assigning operational squadrons directly to the wing.  The 406th Fighter-Bomber Group was inactivated.  In June 1956 F-86D Sabre interceptors arrived from CONUS to equip the 87th Fighter-Interceptor Squadron which was transferred to the 406th from the 81st FBW assigned to RAF Shepherds Grove.  The 87th FIS, however, physically remained at Shepherds Grove, but was under the organizational command of the 406th at Manston.  In September 1955, the 87th was redesignated the 512th FIS.

In May 1958, the 406th was inactivated in place, with its three air defense squadrons being assigned to continental Europe under the 86th Air Division (Defense) at Ramstein Air Base West Germany. The squadrons were transferred to the following bases:

 512th FIS to Sembach Air Base, West Germany
 513th FIS to Phalsbourg-Bourscheid Air Base France
 514th FIS to Ramstein Air Base, West Germany

The F-86D's were eventually withdrawn from Europe in 1961, and the 512th, 513th and 514th were inactivated.

406th Tactical Fighter Training Wing

In February 1970 Project CREEK STEP called for the buildup of Zaragoza Air Base as a USAFE weapons training site, with actual use of the Bardenas Reales Air-to-Ground Bombing and Gunnery Range (about 45 mi/70 km northwest of the base) began in March.

With the closure of Wheelus Air Base in Libya, Zaragoza returned to active status on 19 February 1970 with the activation of the 86th Air Division.  The 406th was elevated to Wing status on 21 July 1972.  Although the 406th had no permanently assigned aircraft, the Wing provided support to all USAFE tactical aircraft which used the Zaragoza range, as well as deployed SAC and TAC units, as well as allied NATO units.

Beginning in September 1972, the 406th also operated the USAFE Tactical Forces Employment School, and in May 1976, began operating the USAFE Instructor Pilot School. Weapons training detachments were principally F-4 Phantom II aircraft, although F-111s used the wing's ranges for a short period in 1974, and U.S. Navy A-7 Corsairs used the range facilities in June 1974. During November 1976, the 406th TFTW began full maintenance support of an SAC KC-135 tanker detachment on a permanent basis.  On 12 September 1977, another facet was added to the wing's training operations when it conducted the first Dissimilar air combat training (DACT) missions with USAF and U.S. Navy aircraft

In 1979, the Instructor Pilot School was closed in July, due to broad changes in USAFE's mission and budget restraints.  On 1 January 1980, the support mission expanded when the 406th assumed responsibility for various functional areas in support of the four USAF tropo-scatter radar sites at Humosa, Mencora, Soller, and Inoges. The wing provided this support in cooperation with the 401st Tactical Fighter Wing assigned to Torrejon AB.

Foremost among the accomplishments of the 406th TFTW during 1981 was the preparation and planning for reception of the F-16 Weapons Training Detachments which began in 1982. The 512nd TFS of the 86th Tactical Fighter Wing at Ramstein AB, West Germany recorded its first F-16C fighter deployment to the Bardenas Reales Range on 3 April 1986. This represented the initial use of the C-model F-16 aircraft at the range since the newer F-16s were introduced to the European theatre.

For the rest of the 1980s, the 406th continued to provide support for USAFE crew training and range training exercises. August 1990 ushered in a period of intense activity, as the 406th and Zaragoza provided major air and ground support for Operation Desert Shield, conducted in response to Iraq's invasion of Kuwait. Thousands of military personnel and tons of equipment passed through Zaragoza en route to the crisis in the Middle East. The base and the wing continued to act as a major aerial port providing support during and after Operation Desert Storm.

Subject to the same provisions requiring the removal of other units from Spain, the 406th began efforts to end its operations and return Zaragoza to the Spanish Government in 1992. The use of the training range ended in December 1991, followed by the turnover of base operations to the Spanish in April 1992.

The 406th Tactical Fighter Training Wing was inactivated on 1 April 1994 when USAFE ended its presence and returned control of Zaragoza Air Base to the Spanish government.

406th Air Expeditionary Wing
The wing was converted to provisional status as the 406th Air Expeditionary Wing.  It was activated on 30 March 2011 at Moron Air Base, Spain to support Operation Odyssey Dawn, a mission to enforce a no-fly zone put in place to protect civilians in Libya during the escalating Libyan Civil War.  The task of assembling an aerial refueling force initially fell to the 171st Air Refueling Wing of the Pennsylvania Air National Guard, starting with two tankers that were already at Moron to support planes rotating to and from the Middle East.  The first four tankers of the 171st arrived on the morning of 20 March.  By the following day, the yet-to-be formally designated wing had grown to a mix of fifteen Boeing KC-135 Stratotankers and four McDonnell Douglas KC-10 Extenders, drawn from 14 different wings of the regular force, Air Force Reserve Command, and the Air National Guard.  Looking at the mix of tail stripes on the planes he commanded, Brigadier General Uptegraff dubbed his unit the "Calico Wing."

Because Congress had not approved the mission, much of the wing's manning was on a volunteer bases, with funding drawn from money budgeted for other purposes.  While operational control of the wing was assigned to United States Air Forces in Europe (USAFE)'s Seventeenth Air Force, deficiencies in manning and experience with air mobility operations led to a combined control between USAFE (for tactical control) and Air Mobility Command (AMC). On 31 March, control of Odyssey Dawn was assumed by NATO, which named it Operation Unified Protector.  On the same day, the confused command situation was emphasised when simultaneous orders from USAFE and AMC designated Uptegraff's wing both the 406th AEW (USAFE), and the 313th Air Expeditionary Wing (AMC). Later accounts emphasize that Uptegraff focused on making sure operations continued, and that the 406th AEW only existed briefly. It is not made clear when the 406 AEW was formally disestablished. In contrast, the 313 AEW existed through October 2011.

Lineage
 Established as 406th Fighter-Bomber Wing on 25 June 1952
 Activated on 10 July 1952
 Redesignated 406th Fighter-Interceptor Wing on 1 April 1954
 Inactivated on 15 May 1958
 Redesignated 406th Tactical Fighter Training Wing on 20 June 1972
 Activated on 15 July 1972
 Inactivated on 31 October 1992
 Redesignated 406th Air Expeditionary Wing, and converted to provisional status, on 5 February 2001
 Activated on 30 March 2011
 Inactivated only "after a brief period".

Assignments
 Third Air Force, 10 July 1952 – 15 May 1958
 Sixteenth Air Force, 15 July 1972 – 31 October 1992
 United States Air Forces in Europe to activate or inactivate at any time after 5 February 2001
 Activated 30 March 2011; inactivated a short time later

Components
Group
 406th Fighter-Bomber (later Fighter-Interceptor) Group: 10 July 1952 – 1 May 1956

Squadrons
 87th Fighter-Bomber Squadron: attached 21 December 1954 – 8 September 1955
 512th Fighter-Interceptor Squadron: 1 May 1956 – 24 March 1958 (Yellow Stripe)
 513th Fighter-Interceptor Squadron: 1 May 1956 – 25 April 1958 (Red Stripe)
 514th Fighter-Interceptor Squadron: 1 May 1956 – 15 May 1958 (Dark Blue Stripe)
 538th Air Expeditionary Advisory Squadron: ???-Present

Stations
 RAF Manston, England, 10 July 1952 – 15 May 1958
 Zaragoza AB, Spain, 15 July 1972 – 31 October 1992
  Diyarbakir, Turkey, 2001–???
 Camp Bastion, Afghanistan ???-Present

References

Notes

Bibliography

 
 
 
 
 Swetzer, Robert L., On NATO's southern flank: A history of Sixteenth Air Force, 1954–1988, Office of History Headquarters, Sixteenth Air Force, United States Air Forces in Europe, 1989

0406
Military units and formations established in 2001